Hugh I (1057 – August 29, 1093) was duke of Burgundy between 1076 and 1079. Hugh was son of Henry of Burgundy and grandson of Duke Robert I. He inherited Burgundy from his grandfather, following the premature death of Henry, but abdicated shortly afterwards to his brother Eudes I, in order to become a monk at Cluny. He briefly fought the Moors in the Iberian Peninsula with Sancho of Aragón. 

His entry to Cluny in 1079, after sustaining injuries in battle, and at the same time than Guy I of Mâcon and Guigues II of Albon, drew criticism from the pope Gregory VII. Gregory thought he had not made sure the duchy was at peace, and was thus endangering the lives of many christians. He took vows as a monk and later became prior of the Benedictine Abbey of Cluny.

See also
Dukes of Burgundy family tree

References

House of Burgundy
Dukes of Burgundy
1057 births
1093 deaths
French Benedictines